Knockrome is a hamlet on the island of Jura, in the civil parish of Jura, in the council area of Argyll and Bute, Scotland. On the 1982 OS 1:10000 map, there were 20 buildings. Knockrome is located about 3.5 miles from Craighouse, on lower lying ground between Knockrome Hill and Cnocan Soilleir. Knockrome is located on the southeast coast of Jura. It is north of Jura Airfield and a prehistoric standing stone.

History 
The name "Knockrome" means "The crooked hill".

References 

Hamlets in Argyll and Bute
Villages on Jura, Scotland